Colltrans is the municipal transit system in the Town of Collingwood in Central Ontario, Canada. Although this is a small system, running only three routes on 30 minute loops from the downtown terminal, it provides service to the community seven days a week, with the exception of statutory holidays. The terminal is an outdoor curbside location on the southeast corner of Second Street and Pine Street with no facilities other than two bus shelters. Fares are $2.00, with students receiving a 50 cent discount and children riding for free.

Services
There are 5 routes that operate Monday to Sunday from 7:00 am to 9:00 pm.

Crosstown Route- Via Cranberry Trail, Hwy 26, First/Second Streets, Hume/Ontario Streets, Pretty River Parkway
East Route- Via Paul Street, Simcoe Street, Raglan Street, Erie Street, Peel Street, Gooden Street, Lockhart Road, Hurontario Street, Patterson Street
West Route- Via Third Street, Balsam Street, High Street, Fifth Street, Tenth Street, Campbell Street, Cameron Street, Maple Street
Collingwood-Blue Mountain Link-
Collingwood-Wasaga Beach Link-

Fleet
All buses are wheelchair accessible and have bike racks.
 2 - Eldorado E-Z Rider II
 2 - NFI XD40
 1 - ADL Enviro 200
 2 - NFI MD30
 1 - Ford Girardin G5

See also

 Public transport in Canada

References

External links
Town of Collingwood — Public Transit
Sinton page for Collingwood Transit

Bus transport in Simcoe County
Public transport in Simcoe County
Transit agencies in Ontario